Patricia Lawlor Hayes  (22 December 1909 – 19 September 1998) was an English character actress.

Early life
Patricia Hayes OBE was born in Streatham, London, the daughter of George Frederick Hayes and Florence Alice Hayes. Her father was a clerk in the civil service and her mother was a schoolmistress. As a child, Hayes attended the Sacred Heart School in Hammersmith.

Career
Hayes attended RADA, graduating in 1928. She spent the next 10 years in repertory theatre.

She was featured in many radio and television comedy shows between 1940 and 1996, including Hancock's Half Hour, Ray's a Laugh, The Arthur Askey Show, The Benny Hill Show, Bootsie and Snudge, Hugh and I and Till Death Us Do Part. She played the part of Henry Bones in the BBC Children's Hour radio programme Norman and Henry Bones – The Boy Detectives during the late 1940s.

Hayes was cast in supporting roles for films including The Bargee (1964), The NeverEnding Story (1984), A Fish Called Wanda (1988) and was also featured as Fin Raziel in the Ron Howard film Willow (1988).

Her most substantial television appearance was in the title role of Edna, the Inebriate Woman (Play for Today, 1971) for which she won a BAFTA award. She provided the character voice for comedy puppet performances for television and DVDs – e.g. Gran (Woodland Animations, 1982).

She was the subject of This Is Your Life in 1972 when she was surprised by Eamonn Andrews.

In April 1975, Hayes was interviewed by Roy Plomley for Desert Island Discs. A sizeable, yet incomplete, extract is available to listen to and download via the programme's website on the BBC.

In 1977, she appeared on the BBC's long running TV variety show The Good Old Days; she had been an early member of the Players' Theatre in London, an old time music hall club, from the 1950s onwards.

In 1985, she starred in the title role of the TV play, Mrs Capper's Birthday, by Noël Coward.

Personal life
She was the mother of British actor Richard O'Callaghan (born Richard Brooke) by her marriage to Valentine Brooke, whom she divorced. She never remarried. She was formerly the head of the British Catholic Stage Guild, which her son later chaired.

She was awarded an OBE in 1987.

Death
Patricia Hayes died in September, 1998 in Puttenham, Surrey, but she appeared posthumously in the 2002 film Crime and Punishment which had been filmed in 1993, but delayed because of a legal case. She is buried at Watts Cemetery, Compton, Surrey.

Television roles

Selected filmography

 Broken Blossoms (1936) – Minor role (uncredited)
 Went the Day Well? (1942) – Daisy
 When We Are Married (1943) – Ruby Birtle
 The Dummy Talks (1943) – (uncredited)
 Hotel Reserve (1944) – Woman
 Candles at Nine (1944) – Gewndolyn – Maid
 Great Day (1945) – Mrs. Beadle
 The Life and Adventures of Nicholas Nickleby (1947) – Phoebe
 To the Public Danger (1948) – Postmistress
 Poet's Pub (1949) – Mrs. Lott (uncredited)
 La Rosa di Bagdad (1949) – Amin (English version, voice)
 Skimpy in the Navy (1949) – (uncredited)
 The Enforcer (1951) – Teenager (uncredited)
 The Love Match (1955) – Emma Binns
 The Battle of the Sexes (1960) – Jeannie Macdougall
 Reach for Glory (1962) – Mrs. Freeman
 Kill or Cure (1962) – Lily – Waitress
 The Sicilians (1963) – Plane passenger
 It's All Over Town (1964) – Charlady
 Saturday Night Out (1964) – Edie's Mother
 The Bargee (1964) – Onlooker (uncredited)
 The Terrornauts (1967) – Mrs. Jones
 A Ghost of a Chance (1968) – Miss Woollie
 Can Heironymus Merkin Ever Forget Mercy Humppe and Find True Happiness? (1969) – Grandma
 Goodbye, Mr. Chips (1969) – Miss Honeybun (uncredited)
 Carry On Again Doctor (1969) – Mrs. Beasley
 Fragment of Fear (1970) – Mrs. Baird
 Raising the Roof (1972) – Aunt Maud
 Super Bitch (1973) – Mamma the Turk
 Love Thy Neighbour (1973) – Annie Booth
 The Best of Benny Hill (1974) – Interviewer ('Words of Comfort') / Marie Quaint
 Danger on Dartmoor (1980) – Mrs. Green
 The NeverEnding Story (1984) – Urgl
 Little Dorrit (1987) – Affery
 Willow (1988) – Fin Raziel
 A Fish Called Wanda (1988) – Mrs. Coady
 War Requiem (1989) – Mother
 The Fool (1990) – The Dowager
 Blue Ice (1992) – Old Woman
 The Steal (1995) – Mrs. Fawkes
 Crime and Punishment (2002) – Alyonna Ivanovna, old pawnbroker (final film role)

References

External links

 
 

1909 births
1998 deaths
20th-century English actresses
Actresses from London
Best Actress BAFTA Award (television) winners
English film actresses
English radio actresses
English Roman Catholics
English television actresses
Officers of the Order of the British Empire
People from Streatham
People from Wandsworth
Alumni of RADA